Fedor Dragojlov (born in 1881 – died 1961 in Buenos Aires, Argentina) was a colonel-general in the Croatian Home Guard, as well as its chief-of-staff from 1943 to 1944. He was Eastern Orthodox Christian.

He was one of only seven to receive the Order of the Crown of King Zvonimir with star and oak leaves, which granted him the title of vitez (knight).

References

1881 births
1961 deaths
Croatian collaborators with Nazi Germany
Croatian military personnel of World War II
Croatian Home Guard personnel
Eastern Orthodox Christians from Croatia
Recipients of the Order of the Crown of King Zvonimir
Yugoslav emigrants to Argentina